North Dravidian is a branch (Zvelebil 1990:56) of the Dravidian languages that includes Brahui, Kurux and Malto. (There have been slight differences in the way the Dravidian languages are grouped by various Dravidian linguists: See Subrahmanyam 1983, Zvelebil 1990, Krishnamurthi 2003). It is further divided into Kurux-Malto and Brahui.

Phonological features
Northern Dravidian is characterized by the retraction of Proto Dravidian *k to /q/ before vowels other than /i(:)/ and later spirantizing in Brahui and Kurux, in return the *c also retracted to /k/ in the same environment.

Initial *w's became b likely due to influence from eastern Indo Aryan languages. Brahui also has a voiceless lateral which formed after the merge of *ḷ to *l as there are words from both of them but the conditions of the split are not clear.

References

Bibliography

 

Languages of India
Dravidian languages